In theoretical physics, twistor theory was proposed by Roger Penrose in 1967 as a possible path to quantum gravity and has evolved into a widely studied branch of theoretical and mathematical physics. Penrose's idea was that twistor space should be the basic arena for physics from which space-time itself should emerge. It has led to powerful mathematical tools that have applications to differential and integral geometry, nonlinear differential equations and representation theory, and in physics to general relativity, quantum field theory, and the theory of scattering amplitudes. Twistor theory arose in the context of the rapidly expanding mathematical developments in Einstein's theory of general relativity in the late 1950s and in the 1960s and carries a number of influences from that period. In particular, Roger Penrose has credited Ivor Robinson as an important early influence in the development of twistor theory, through his construction of so-called Robinson congruences.

Overview
Mathematically, projective twistor space  is a 3-dimensional complex manifold, complex projective 3-space . It has the physical interpretation of the space of massless particles with spin. It is the projectivisation of a 4-dimensional complex vector space, non-projective twistor space  with a Hermitian form of signature (2,2) and a holomorphic volume form. This can be most naturally understood as the space of chiral (Weyl) spinors for the conformal group  of Minkowski space; it is the fundamental representation of the spin group  of the conformal group. This definition can be extended to arbitrary dimensions except that beyond dimension four, one defines projective twistor space to be the space of projective pure spinors for the conformal group.

In its original form, twistor theory encodes physical fields on Minkowski space into complex analytic objects on twistor space via the Penrose transform. This is especially natural for massless fields of arbitrary spin. In the first instance these are obtained via contour integral formulae in terms of free holomorphic functions on regions in twistor space. These constructions have had wide applications, including inter alia the theory of integrable systems.

The self-duality condition is a major limitation for incorporating the full nonlinearities of physical theories, although it does suffice for Yang–Mills–Higgs monopoles and instantons (see ADHM construction). An early attempt to overcome this restriction was the introduction of ambitwistors by Edward Witten and by Isenberg, Yasskin & Green. Ambitwistor space is the space of complexified light rays or massless particles and can be regarded as a complexification or cotangent bundle of the original twistor description. These apply to general fields but the field equations are no longer so simply expressed.

Twistorial formulae for interactions beyond the self-dual sector first arose from Witten's twistor string theory. This is a quantum theory of holomorphic maps of a Riemann surface into twistor space. It gave rise to the remarkably compact RSV (Roiban, Spradlin & Volovich) formulae for tree-level S-matrices of Yang–Mills theories, but its gravity degrees of freedom gave rise to a version of conformal supergravity limiting its applicability; conformal gravity is an unphysical theory containing ghosts, but its interactions are combined with those of Yang–Mills theory in loop amplitudes calculated via twistor string theory.

Despite its shortcomings, twistor string theory led to rapid developments in the study of scattering amplitudes. One was the so-called MHV formalism loosely based on disconnected strings, but was given a more basic foundation in terms of a twistor action for full Yang–Mills theory in twistor space. Another key development was the introduction of BCFW recursion. This has a natural formulation in twistor space that in turn led to remarkable formulations of scattering amplitudes in terms of Grassmann integral formulae and polytopes. These ideas have evolved more recently into the positive Grassmannian and amplituhedron.

Twistor string theory was extended first by generalising the RSV Yang–Mills amplitude formula, and then by finding the underlying string theory. The extension to gravity was given by Cachazo & Skinner, and formulated as a twistor string theory for maximal supergravity by David Skinner. Analogous formulae were then found in all dimensions by Cachazo, He & Yuan for Yang–Mills theory and gravity and subsequently for a variety of other theories. They were then understood as string theories in ambitwistor space by Mason & Skinner in a general framework that includes the original twistor string and extends to give a number of new models and formulae. As string theories they have the same critical dimensions as conventional string theory; for example the type II supersymmetric versions are critical in ten dimensions and are equivalent to the full field theory of type II supergravities in ten dimensions (this is distinct from conventional string theories that also have a further infinite hierarchy of massive higher spin states that provide an ultraviolet completion). They extend to give formulae for loop amplitudes and can be defined on curved backgrounds.

The twistor correspondence
Introduce 2-component spinor indices  and set

This together with the holomorphic volume form,  is invariant under the group SU(2,2), a quadruple cover of the conformal group C(1,3) of compactified Minkowski spacetime.

Points in Minkowski space are related to subspaces of twistor space through the incidence relation

A point  thereby determines a line  in  parametrised by  A twistor  is easiest understood in space-time for complex values of the coordinates where it defines a totally null two-plane that is self-dual. Take  to be real, then if  vanishes, then  lies on a light ray, whereas if  is non-vanishing, there are no solutions, and indeed then  corresponds to a massless particle with spin that are not localised in real space-time.

Variations

Supertwistors

Supertwistors are a supersymmetric extension of twistors introduced by Alan Ferber in 1978. The super conformal group  naturally acts on this space and a supersymmetric version of the Penrose transform takes cohomology classes on supertwistor space to massless supersymmetric multiplets on super Minkowski space. The  case provides the target for Penrose's original twistor string and the  case is that for Skinner's supergravity generalisation.

Hyperkähler manifolds 
Hyperkähler manifolds of dimension  also admit a twistor correspondence with a twistor space of complex dimension .

Palatial twistor theory
The nonlinear graviton construction encodes only anti-self-dual, i.e., left-handed fields. A first step towards the problem of modifying twistor space so as to encode a general gravitational field is the encoding of right-handed fields. Infinitesimally, these are encoded in twistor functions or cohomology classes of homogeneity −6. The task of using such twistor functions in a fully nonlinear way so as to obtain a right-handed nonlinear graviton has been referred to as the (gravitational) googly problem (the word "googly" is a term used in the game of cricket for a ball bowled with right-handed helicity using the apparent action that would normally give rise to left-handed helicity). The most recent proposal in this direction by Penrose in 2015 was based on noncommutative geometry on twistor space and referred to as palatial twistor theory. The theory is named after Buckingham Palace, where Michael Atiyah suggested to Penrose the use of a type of "noncommutative algebra", an important component of the theory (the underlying twistor structure in palatial twistor theory was modeled not on the twistor space but on the non-commutative holomorphic twistor quantum algebra).

See also
 Background independence
 Complex spacetime
 History of loop quantum gravity
 Robinson congruences
 Spin network

Notes

References
 Roger Penrose (2004), The Road to Reality, Alfred A. Knopf, ch. 33, pp. 958–1009.
 Roger Penrose and Wolfgang Rindler (1984), Spinors and Space-Time; vol. 1, Two-Spinor Calculus and Relativitic Fields, Cambridge University Press, Cambridge.
 Roger Penrose and Wolfgang Rindler (1986), Spinors and Space-Time; vol. 2, Spinor and Twistor Methods in Space-Time Geometry, Cambridge University Press, Cambridge.

Further reading
 
 Baird, P., "An Introduction to Twistors."
 Huggett, S. and Tod, K. P. (1994). An Introduction to Twistor Theory, second edition. Cambridge University Press. . OCLC 831625586.
 Hughston, L. P. (1979) Twistors and Particles. Springer Lecture Notes in Physics 97, Springer-Verlag. . 
 Hughston, L. P. and Ward, R. S., eds (1979) Advances in Twistor Theory. Pitman. .
 Mason, L. J. and Hughston, L. P., eds (1990) Further Advances in Twistor Theory, Volume I: The Penrose Transform and its Applications. Pitman Research Notes in Mathematics Series 231, Longman Scientific and Technical. .
 Mason, L. J., Hughston, L. P., and Kobak, P. K., eds (1995) Further Advances in Twistor Theory, Volume II: Integrable Systems, Conformal Geometry, and Gravitation. Pitman Research Notes in Mathematics Series 232, Longman Scientific and Technical. .
 Mason, L. J., Hughston, L. P., Kobak, P. K., and Pulverer, K., eds (2001) Further Advances in Twistor Theory, Volume III: Curved Twistor Spaces. Research Notes in Mathematics 424, Chapman and Hall/CRC. .

External links
 Penrose, Roger (1999), "Einstein's Equation and Twistor Theory: Recent Developments"
 Penrose, Roger; Hadrovich, Fedja. "Twistor Theory."
 Hadrovich, Fedja, "Twistor Primer."
 Penrose, Roger. "On the Origins of Twistor Theory."
 Jozsa, Richard (1976), "Applications of Sheaf Cohomology in Twistor Theory."
 
 Andrew Hodges, Summary of recent developments.
 Huggett, Stephen (2005), "The Elements of Twistor Theory."
 Mason, L. J., "The twistor programme and twistor strings: From twistor strings to quantum gravity?"
 
 Sparling, George (1999), "On Time Asymmetry."
 
 MathWorld: Twistors.
 Universe Review: "Twistor Theory."
 Twistor newsletter archives.

Clifford algebras
Quantum field theory
Theories of gravity